Manoj Kumar, also known as Manoj Sharma is a politician in Bihar. He is a former member of Bihar Legislative Assembly representing Goh Vidhan Sabha constituency.

Family 
He is the son of former MLA and politician Devkumar Sharma. His father, Devkumar Sharma represented Goh constituency in 1985 from Congress and 2000 from Samta Party.

Political career 
He started his political career from Bhartiya Janata Party in 2015 Bihar Assembly polls contesting from Goh. He won the election over more than 7,000 votes. In 2020 he lost the elections from same constituency to RJD candidate Bheem Kumar Yadav. He is also the spokesperson of BJP Bihar Unit.

References 

Bharatiya Janata Party politicians from Bihar
Politics of Aurangabad district, Bihar
Year of birth missing (living people)
Living people
Bihar MLAs 2015–2020